The  is a subway line in Tokyo, Japan, operated by Tokyo Metro. It is the oldest subway line in Asia, having opened in 1927.

The line was named after the Ginza commercial district in Chūō, Tokyo, under which it passes. On maps, diagrams and signboards, the line is shown using the color orange, and its stations are given numbers using the letter "G".

Operations
Almost all Ginza Line trains operate on the line's full length from Asakusa to Shibuya. However, two trains depart in the early morning from Toranomon, and some late-night trains from Shibuya are taken out of service at Ueno. Along with the Marunouchi Line, it is self-enclosed and does not have any through services with other railway lines.

On weekdays, trains run every 2 minutes 15 seconds in the morning and evening peak and every 5 minutes during the daytime. The first trains start from Shibuya and Asakusa at 05:01, and the last ones reach Shibuya at 00:37, and Asakusa at 00:39.

Station list

Being the oldest line on the Tokyo Metro, stations are also the closest to the surface—generally no more than one and a half stories underground. The western end of the line enters Shibuya Station located on the third-floor of a building that is located in a depression.

History
The Ginza Line was conceived by a businessman named Noritsugu Hayakawa, who visited London in 1914, saw the London Underground and concluded that Tokyo needed its own underground railway.

Originally, the Ginza Line was proposed to open from Shimbashi to Asakusa all at once, but because of a recession following the Great Kanto Earthquake, it became difficult to raise funds for the line. Upon its opening, the line was so popular that passengers often had to wait more than two hours to ride a train for a five-minute trip.

The "Ginza Line" name was applied in 1953 to distinguish the line from the new Marunouchi Line. In the postwar economic boom, the Ginza Line became increasingly crowded. The new Hanzōmon Line began to relieve the Ginza Line's traffic in the 1980s, but the Ginza Line is still quite crowded as it serves major residential, commercial, and business districts in central Tokyo. According to a 2018 release of Tokyo Metropolitan Bureau of Transportation, the Ginza Line is the seventh most crowded subway line in Tokyo, running at 160% capacity between Akasaka-Mitsuke and Tameike-Sannō stations.

Automatic train control (ATC) and train automatic stopping controller (TASC) were activated on the Ginza Line on July 31, 1993, replacing the previous mechanical automatic train stop (ATS) system. The newest station on the line, Tameike-Sannō Station, opened in 1997 to provide a connection to the newly built Namboku Line.

The line, station facilities, rolling stock, and related assets were inherited by Tokyo Metro after the privatization of the Teito Rapid Transit Authority (TRTA) in 2004.

Rolling stock

They are powered by a third rail electrified at 600 V DC. Both the Ginza Line and the Marunouchi Line are the only Tokyo Metro lines to use  and third rail electrification, while subsequent lines employ narrow gauge rails and 1,500 V DC overhead power supply to accommodate through services.

The facility is capable of holding up to 20 6-car formations. Major inspections are carried out at Tokyo Metro's Nakano depot on the Marunouchi Line, forwarding over a connecting track at Akasaka-Mitsuke.

Former rolling stock
 100 series (1938–1968)
 1000 series (TRTA) (1927–1968)
 1100 series (1930–1968)
 1200 series (1934–1986)
 1300 series (1949–1986)
 1400 series (1953–1985)
 1500 series (1954–1986)
 1500N series (1968–1993)
 1600 series (1955–1986)
 1700 series (1956–1986)
 1800 series (1958–1986)
 1900 series (1958–1987)
 2000 series (1958–1993)
 01 series 6-car EMUs, from 1983 until March 2017

The last remaining 01 series trains were withdrawn from regular service on 10 March 2017.

References

 Shaw, Dennis and Morioka, Hisashi, "Tokyo Subways", published 1992 by Hoikusha Publishing

External links

 Ginza Line overview (Tokyo Metro) 

 
Lines of Tokyo Metro
Metro Ginza Line
Railway lines opened in 1927
Standard gauge railways in Japan
1927 establishments in Japan
600 V DC railway electrification